Potentilla intermedia is a species of flowering plant belonging to the family Rosaceae.

Its native range is Poland to Russian Far East.

References

intermedia